{{Infobox person
| name        = Steve Levy
| image       = Steve Levy (right) (cropped).jpg
| caption     = Levy in 2021
| birthname   = 
| birth_date  = 
| birth_place = 
| education   = State University of New York at Oswego
| occupation  = Sportscaster
| years_active = 1993–present
| alias       = 
| title       =  
| family      =
| spouse      = Ani Levy
| children    = 
| relatives   = 
| credits     = SportsCenter MLB Baseball, NFL football, College football 
| agent       = 
| URL         = 
}}

Steve Levy (born March 12, 1965) is an American journalist and sportscaster for ESPN. He is known for his work broadcasting college football, Monday Night Football and the National Hockey League.

Early life and career
Levy went to John F. Kennedy High School in Bellmore, New York, and then graduated in 1987 from the State University of New York at Oswego with a degree in communications and broadcasting. Before working for ESPN, he worked in New York City in radio and/or television for WFAN, MSG Network, WCBS-TV, WABC-AM, and WNBC-AM. He is Jewish.

ESPN (1993–present)
Levy has been with ESPN since August 1, 1993.

At ESPN, he usually works on SportsCenter, and has hosted the late night edition on Monday night during the NFL season, following Monday Night Football. He covered NHL regular season and playoff games before the network lost the rights to televise the league's games. He also previously covered the network's college football coverage for four seasons, 1999–2002, returning to this role in 2016. He also served as a fill-in play-by-play commentator for Wednesday Night Baseball. He served as ESPN's lead play-by-play announcer for the XFL in 2020.

He is known for infamously using the phrase "bulging dick" instead of "bulging disc" on an episode of SportsCenter.

National Hockey League
Levy is a prolific and well-known NHL broadcaster. He has earned the nickname "Mr. Extra Period" for having called three of the longest televised games in NHL history, all of which have been playoff games: a 1996 game between the Pittsburgh Penguins and the Washington Capitals that went four overtimes; a 2000 contest that also featured the Penguins, this time playing the Philadelphia Flyers, which went five overtimes; and a 2003 matchup between the Mighty Ducks of Anaheim and the Dallas Stars, which also went five overtimes, and lasted six hours. The only two games to go longer took place before the era of television.

Monday Night Football
In 2019, Levy called one of ESPN's Monday Night Football matchups in week 1 alongside his broadcast partner Brian Griese. The following year, Levy was named to the primary Monday Night Football crew along with Griese and Louis Riddick, which lasted until the hiring of Joe Buck and Troy Aikman in 2022. Levy will continue calling NFL for ESPN on the #2 team. He will be paired with Louis Riddick and Dan Orlovsky.

Other appearances
Levy has appeared in a print advertisement for Swiss watchmaker Raymond Weil. He appeared as himself in Home Improvement and a pair of 2005 films, covering the Boston Red Sox in spring training in Fever Pitch, and the Special Olympics in The Ringer. He also appeared in The Game Plan, released in 2007 and Parental Guidance'', released in 2012. Levy performed a cameo role in the interactive video for the Bob Dylan classic "Like A Rolling Stone".

Levy and Barry Melrose did play-by-play for the 2016 edition of the World Cup of Hockey on ESPN.

References

External links
 

1965 births
Living people
National Hockey League broadcasters
College football announcers
ESPN people
National Football League announcers
Major League Baseball broadcasters
XFL (2020) broadcasters
John F. Kennedy High School (Bellmore, New York) alumni
State University of New York at Oswego alumni